The venerable Aloísio Sebastião Boeing (Vargem do Cedro, December 24, 1913 – Jaraguá do Sul, April 17, 2006) was a Catholic priest from the Diocese of Joinville.

On February 23, 2023, Pope Francis recognized his heroic virtues.

Biography

First years 
Father Aloísio was born on December 24, 1913 (Wednesday), in Vargem do Cedro (Santa Catarina), at that time a district of Imaruí, today belonging to São Martinho. Firstborn of a German Catholic family, he was baptized on December 26 of the same year and confirmed on January 22, 1914, in the Parish of São Sebastião, Vargem do Cedro. His parents João Boeing and Josephina Effting Boeing, attended mass and prayed the rosary daily. It was in this environment that Aloísio developed his life and personality in childhood: in a home of practicing Catholic parents.

At the age of twelve, on February 11, 1925, encouraged by the parish priest, he left his homeland with three other colleagues, to the priesthood.

At the seminary 
The stages of their formation took place basically in Brusque and Taubaté (state of São Paulo). The first religious profession took place in Brusque on 16 January 1934. Theology studies were done in Taubaté from 1938 to 1941.

He was ordained a priest on December 1, 1940 (Sunday).

Priesthood 
As a consecrated man and priest, he dedicated much of his life to formation, especially in Jaraguá do Sul.

He was a master of novices for 24 years.

He became a trainer with a reputation as a firm, devout, and zealous. He had great devotion to the Virgin Mary. On his initiative, this Novitiate was named after Our Lady of Fatima. He was esteemed, distinguished by his kindness and paternal welcome from the students who sought him for spiritual guidance.

Pastoral 
Father Aloísio has always worked in the field of pastoral care. From the beginning of his priestly life, he was also sought by the people for spiritual counseling until the end of his life. That was the skill he developed throughout his life.

Often, until dawn, he was sought after at home or by telephone for spiritual guidance, family counseling, and health blessing. He never stopped answering. At the end of his life, often sick, in bed, he attended, lying down, to the most urgent cases. He felt compassion for the people, especially the sick, the elderly and the poor. He had a special taste for the colloquium of spiritual things and spoke whole hours without tire.

Death 
Father Aloísio died on April 17, 2006 (Monday).

Feeling close to his departure and feeling leave to everyone he loved, said: "You will find me in the Eucharist." He was buried in the garden, next to the Church of Our Lady of the Rosary, in the Nereu Ramos neighborhood, in Jaraguá do Sul. It's a place of prayer and thanks.

Legacy 
People testify to having already achieved thanks for his intercession.

Every 17th of each month, remembering the day of his death, the Mass of Mercy is celebrated at 3:00 p.m. "We have lost a very dear priest, but we have won a saint in heaven!" Fr. Osnildo Klann, dehonian

Beatification 
The beatification process was opened in 2013 by the then diocesan bishop, Bishop Irineu Roque Scherer. The diocesan phase was closed in 2015.

Biographical documentary 
On December 1, 2020, the date of the 80th anniversary of the priestly ordination of Father Aloísio, those responsible for his process of recognition of holiness released a free documentary, lasting 0:53:40, The Daily Holiness. It was made available via YouTube.

References

External links 
 Official website

1913 births
2006 deaths
People from Santa Catarina (state)
20th-century Brazilian Roman Catholic priests
21st-century Brazilian Roman Catholic priests
Brazilian venerated Catholics